Mutio Scevola or Muzio Scevola (Mucius Scaevola) is an opera in three acts and a prologue by the Italian composer Francesco Cavalli, with a libretto by Giovanni Faustini.  It was based on the story of the Roman hero, Gaius Mucius Scaevola.  The opera was first performed at the Teatro San Samuele, Venice on 26 January 1665 and revived in Bologna in 1667.

Roles

References
Sources
Brenac, Jean-Claude, Le magazine de l'opéra baroque online at perso.orange.fr. Retrieved 4 April 2022.

1665 operas
Operas
Operas by Francesco Cavalli
Italian-language operas